The Paddy Creek Wilderness is a  wilderness area in the U.S. state of Missouri, United States. The United States Congress designated it wilderness in 1983. It was named for Big and Little Paddy Creeks that run through the area. The Paddy Creek Wilderness is one of eight wilderness areas protected and preserved in Missouri. The trails are rugged and can be challenging for the inexperienced or unprepared hiker. Horseback riding is also common on the Piney Creek Trail. 

The Paddy Creek Recreation Area is nearby, and offers many camping amenities. There are many single sites, and a few double sites available. There is also fishing access on the Big Piney River, via a trail access from the campground.

See also 

 Bell Mountain Wilderness
 Devils Backbone Wilderness
 Hercules-Glades Wilderness
 Irish Wilderness
 Piney Creek Wilderness
 Rockpile Mountain Wilderness

External links 
 Missouri Wilderness Areas
 Hike Report and Directions
 Hike Report, Maps, and Photo Gallery

IUCN Category Ib
Protected areas of Texas County, Missouri
Wilderness areas of Missouri
Mark Twain National Forest
Protected areas established in 1983
1983 establishments in Missouri